Sir William Hankford KB (or Hankeford) (c. 1350 – 1423) of Annery in Devon, was an English lawyer, and Chief Justice of the King's Bench from 1413 until 1423.

Origins
His parentage is not known, but he came from a gentry family which originated at and took its name from the estate of Hankford, near Bulkworthy in the parish of Buckland Brewer, North Devon.

Career
He was educated at the Middle Temple, appointed serjeant-at-law in 1388 and king's serjeant in 1389. He was employed by the Earl of Devon from 1384, and repeatedly as a royal justice and commissioner in southern England. In 1394 he accompanied King Richard II (1377–1399) to Ireland. He served as Lord Chief Justice of the King's Bench for Ireland from 1395 to 1396.

In 1397, King Richard II decided to strike back at the Lords Appellant, a group of noblemen who years earlier had partly usurped royal authority, and had executed several of Richard's favourites. The next year Hankford was among the justices consulted concerning the validity of a legal ruling from 1387 which had declared the Appellants' actions unlawful and treasonable. Hankford expressed his support for the rulings, and said he would have ruled the same way himself.

On 6 May 1398 Hankford was appointed to succeed his friend Sir John Wadham as Justice of the Court of Common Pleas. In 1399 at the coronation of King Henry IV, who as Henry Bolingbroke had in that year deposed Richard II, Hankford was made a Knight of the Bath. In spite of his loyalty to the deposed King Richard II, Hankford was reappointed by Henry IV in October 1399, and shortly after appointed a Justice of the King's Bench. In the following years he distinguished himself and was appointed Chief Justice of the King's Bench at the accession of King Henry V in 1413.

Marriage and children
By 1380 he had married a certain Cristina, possibly the heiress of the de Stapledon family of the estate of Annery, in the parish of Monkleigh, Devon, according to the Devon historian Tristram Risdon (d.1640). Hankford or his recent ancestor had certainly acquired the estate of Annery, though whether through inheritance by marriage or by purchase is unclear. He had the following children:
Richard Hankford (died 1419), MP for Devon in 1414 and 1416. He was the father of:
Sir Richard Hankford (c. 1397 – 1431), who became his grandfather's heir upon his death in 1423. His daughter Anne Hankford (c. 1431 – 13 November 1485) and her husband Thomas Butler, 7th Earl of Ormond (c. 1426 – 3 August 1515) were the great-grandparents of Queen Anne Boleyn. 
Jane Hankford, wife of Sir Theobald de Gorges, a paternal grandson of the defendant of the notable 14th-century Warbelton v Gorges heraldic law case. 
Jane Hankford (d.1448), who married twice:
First, according to Vivian, to Sir John Wadham of Edge, Branscombe in Devon, and of Merryfield, Ilton, Somerset (1389–1398), Justice of the Common Pleas and MP for Exeter in 1399 and for Devon in 1401; though this is not mentioned in his modern History of Parliament biography, and although John Wadham's first wife was, according to his will, a certain Maud by whom he had a son called Robert, it is clear from the will that she died before his second marriage in 1385 to Joan Wrottesley.
Secondly (as his 2nd wife) to Sir Robert Cary (d. circa 1431) of Cockington, Devon, 12 times Member of Parliament for Devon, son and heir of Sir John Cary (d.1395), Chief Baron of the Exchequer, attainted in 1388, much of whose forfeited Somerset lands were acquired jointly by Sir William Hankford and Sir John Wadham.

Death and burial
 
Hankford died on 12 December 1423, while still in office. A peculiar legend is associated with his death, based on a strong local tradition, reported by both Robert Danby (d. 1474) and Raphael Holinshed (d. 1580). Allegedly Hankford had instructed his forester of his estate at Annery to shoot with an arrow anyone entering his forest, only himself deliberately to wander into the forest at night, where accordingly he was shot. His death thus appears possibly as a noble form of suicide, which would not debar him from Christian burial. As late as the 17th century there was still a tree-stump known locally as "Hankford's Oak" where the judge supposedly was killed. Whether the story is true or not, Hankford had certainly written his testament only two days before his death. He was buried in Monkleigh church, to which he had contributed extensive rebuilding, and his ornate Easter Sepulchre monument survives in the Annery Chapel in Monkleigh Church.

Sir William Hankford's ornate Easter Sepulchre monument survives against the south wall of the Annery Chapel, in Monkleigh Church.

References

Sources
Prince, John, (1643–1723), The Worthies of Devon, 1810 edition, pp. 458–462, biography of Sir William Hankford 

1350s births
1423 deaths
14th-century English judges
Lord chief justices of England and Wales
Serjeants-at-law (England)
Justices of the Common Pleas
Knights of the Bath
Lords chief justice of Ireland
15th-century English judges